Barbara Jane Horrocks (born 18 January 1964) is a British actress. She portrayed the roles of Bubble and Katy Grin in the BBC sitcom Absolutely Fabulous. She was nominated for the 1993 Olivier Award for Best Actress for the title role in the stage play The Rise and Fall of Little Voice, and received Golden Globe and BAFTA nominations for the role in the film version of Little Voice.

Early life 
Horrocks was born in Rawtenstall, Lancashire, the daughter of Barbara (née Ashworth), a hospital worker, and John Horrocks, a sales representative. She was the youngest of three children.

She attended Balladen County Primary School (Fearns county secondary school). She trained at Oldham College, and the Royal Academy of Dramatic Art with Imogen Stubbs and Ralph Fiennes, and began her career with the Royal Shakespeare Company.

Career

Stage
Horrocks has appeared on stage in Ask for the Moon (Hampstead, 1986), A Collier's Friday Night (Greenwich, 1987), Valued Friends (Hampstead, 1989), and The Debutante Ball (Hampstead, 1989). She appeared in Catherine Cookson's The Fifteen Streets, alongside Sean Bean and Owen Teale in 1989; Our Own Kind (Bush, 1991); Deadly Advice (Fletcher, 1993); Cabaret (Donmar Warehouse 1994); Macbeth (Greenwich Theatre, 1995); and Absurd Person Singular (Garrick Theatre, 2007).

While working on Road, a play directed by Jim Cartwright, Horrocks warmed up by doing singing impressions of Judy Garland, Shirley Bassey and Ethel Merman. Cartwright was so impressed with her mimicry he wrote The Rise and Fall of Little Voice for her. She was nominated for the Laurence Olivier Award for Best Actress for her performance in the 1992 West End production, directed by her then-boyfriend Sam Mendes.

Her last West End appearance was in Sweet Panic, the 2003 Stephen Poliakoff drama in which she portrayed a neurotic mother locked in a battle of wills with her disturbed son's psychologist. She starred in Richard Jones's critically acclaimed production of The Good Soul of Szechuan at the Young Vic in 2008. She was reunited with Jones in a new musical production of Annie Get Your Gun, which opened at the Young Vic in October 2009. At London's Young Vic, in 2016's  If You Kiss Me, Kiss Me, Horrocks revisited the songs of her youth to sing versions of tracks by the likes of Joy Division, The Smiths, Buzzcocks, and The Human League.

In October 2014, Horrocks played Ella Khan in the London revival of East Is East at Trafalgar Studios as part of Jamie Lloyd's Trafalgar Transformed season.

Screen
She drew critical notice for her performance in the film Life Is Sweet (1990), followed by her award-winning performance in the West End play The Rise and Fall of Little Voice in which she sang all the songs. Horrocks became well known on screen for her role as Bubble & Katy Grin in the sitcom Absolutely Fabulous (1992–2016).

She reprised her stage role in the 1998 screen adaptation, Little Voice, which earned nominations for the Golden Globe Award for Best Actress - Motion Picture Musical or Comedy, the BAFTA Award for Best Actress in a Leading Role, the Satellite Award for Best Actress - Motion Picture Musical or Comedy, the Screen Actors Guild Award for Outstanding Performance by a Female Actor in a Leading Role - Motion Picture, and the British Independent Film Award for Best Actress.

For 10 years, Horrocks appeared with Prunella Scales in commercials for the UK supermarket chain Tesco. She narrated BBC Two's television series The Speaker in April 2009.

In 2009, Horrocks took the lead in the BBC TV production Gracie!, a drama portraying the life of Gracie Fields during World War II and her relationship with the Italian-born director Monty Banks (played by Tom Hollander).

Other television credits include Absolutely Fabulous, Victoria Wood - We'd Quite Like to Apologise, Bad Girl, Boon, Heartland, Hunting Venus, La Nonna, Leaving Home, Never Mind the Horrocks, Nightlife, Wyrd Sisters, Foxbusters, Jericho, Red Dwarf, Some Kind of Life, Suffer the Little Children, The Storyteller, The Garden, Fifi & the Flowertots, Little Princess (the voice of the princess) and Welcome to the Times.
 
She was the subject of an episode of the genealogy series Who Do You Think You Are? in 2006. That year, she played the title role in The Amazing Mrs Pritchard, a drama about a woman elected prime minister.

On Tuesday 14 January 2014, Horrocks appeared as a contestant on The Great Sport Relief Bake Off on BBC Two— the celebrity version of The Great British Bake Off—hosted by Jo Brand and broadcast to help raise money for the charity Sport Relief. The other contestants were TV and radio presenter Kirsty Young, choreographer Jason Gardiner, and Olympic athlete Greg Rutherford.

On 9 May 2015, she gave a reading at VE Day 70: A Party to Remember in Horse Guards Parade, London that was broadcast live on BBC1.

In 2015, she supplied the voice of the Tubby Phone in the reboot of the popular British children's television series Teletubbies. In 2021, she began starring in the Sky comedy series Bloods.

Audio
Horrocks' voiceovers have been used on the films Chicken Run, Christmas Carol: The Movie, Corpse Bride, Garfield: A Tail of Two Kitties, and Tinker Bell. She also did the voiceover of Fenchurch on radio and in the audio adaptation of Douglas Adams' science fiction series The Hitchhiker's Guide to the Galaxy for BBC Radio 4. She has voiced Donner in all three Robbie the Reindeer films in aid of Comic Relief.

In 2000, Horrocks made the CD Further Adventures of Little Voice, again singing in the style of favourite divas. The recording includes duets with Ewan McGregor, Robbie Williams and Dean Martin. Horrocks collaborated once more with Robbie Williams the following year, for a cover of the Bobby Darin song "Things" on Williams's album Swing When You're Winning.

Personal life 

Horrocks has a son, Dylan, and daughter Molly with her former partner, playwright Nick Vivian from whom she parted after 21 years, in 2017. She currently lives alone after parting from actor Danny Webb in 2021, her home is now a regency style apartment in Brighton, overlooking the English Channel. She was previously in relationships with director Sam Mendes and the singer and actor Ian Dury about whom, she devised the 2022 drama, Love Pants: Ian Dury & Jane Horrocks, for BBC Radio 4, based on her own diary entries and his love letters to her during their one year relationship in the 1980s when she was 23, the two remained friends until his death in 2000. Horrocks' mother, Barbara, died in 2021 and her father died in 2013.

Filmography

Film

Television series

Television films

Short film, television and video

Music videos
New Order - 1963 (1995)

Awards and honours 
 BAFTA Awards (1999): Nomination for Best Performance by an Actress in a Leading Role for Little Voice (1998)
 British Independent Film Awards (1999): Nomination for Best Actress for Little Voice (1998)
 Chicago Film Critics Association Awards (1999): Nomination for Best Actress for Little Voice (1998)
 Golden Globes (1999): Nomination for Best Performance by an Actress in a Motion Picture -Comedy/Musical, for Little Voice (1998)
 Los Angeles Film Critics Association Awards (1991): Won Award for Best Supporting Actress for Life Is Sweet (1991)
 National Society of Film Critics Awards (1992): Won Award for Best Supporting Actress for Life Is Sweet
 Satellite Awards (1999): Nomination for Best Performance by an Actress in a Motion Picture - Comedy or Musical for Little Voice (1998)
 Screen Actors Guild Awards (1999): Nomination for Outstanding Performance by a Cast, for Little Voice (1998), shared with Annette Badland, Brenda Blethyn, Jim Broadbent, Michael Caine, Philip Jackson and Ewan McGregor
 Screen Actors Guild Awards (1999): Nomination for Outstanding Performance by a Female Actor in a Leading Role for Little Voice (1998)
 Sitges - Catalan International Film Festival (1994): Won Best Actress Award for Deadly Advice (1994)

References

External links

BBC interview
Jane Horrocks on BBC Drama Faces
 The many faces of Jane Horrocks
Jane Horrocks on Who Do You Think You Are?

1964 births
Living people
Actresses from Lancashire
Alumni of RADA
British comedy actresses
English film actresses
English radio actresses
English stage actresses
English television actresses
English voice actresses
English women comedians
English women writers
People from Rawtenstall
Royal Shakespeare Company members
20th-century English actresses
21st-century English actresses